Marime or Mahrime is an important concept in traditional Romani culture, particularly within Vlax and Northern Roma groups, that refers to a notion of ritual cleanliness. The opposite of marime is žužo, a term referring to ritual impurity.

Terminology
The term marime is derived from the Greek language. In England and Wales, the concept is referred to as moxado and in Poland as magerdó. Moxado and magerdó both mean "besmirched" and are derived from "mraks", a Sanskrit term meaning "smeared". Sinti people refer to the concept with the terms "palećido" (neglected or isolated) and "prast(l)o" (inflamed or outlawed).

About
While each adult is capable of causing ritual pollution, adult women of child-bearing age have traditionally been assumed to possess a particular power to cause ritual pollution. The notions of marime and žužo refer to particular regions of the body and physical proximity to those regions. The body above the waist is considered ritually pure, while the body below the waist is considered ritually impure and capable of polluting the pure. Only the hands are capable of freely moving between the pure and the impure. Requirements for ritual purity pertain to almost all aspects of Romani life and culture, including domestic arrangements, preparation of food, washing of clothing, and all public interactions between men and women. Because restrooms must be segregated according to sex to avoid ritual pollution, Romani people have traditionally preferred homes with at least two separate restrooms. A man may become marime if he is in a room below a woman on the second floor. Publicly discussing matters related to the lower body may cause ritual pollution or be considered offensive. Some Romani people may believe that interactions with non-Romani people, commonly referred to as gadjos, might cause ritual pollution. Some Romani people may install new sinks and toilets when they move into a residence that was once inhabited by non-Romani people.

A person who brings shame or scandal to the Romani community may be considered marime and therefore banished  as an outcast. The decision to declare a person marime is decided by a kris, a traditional Romani court used for conflict resolution. A person's designation as marime may be temporary or permament. Due to bringing too much exposure to the Romani community of Spokane, Washington, the Romani leader Jimmy Marks was deemed marime by the community.

See also
Kashrut
Ritual purification
Ritual purity in Islam
Romani society and culture
Tumah and taharah

References

External links

Romani culture
Romani religion
Romani society
Vlax